Creme Puff may refer to:

Animal
Creme Puff (cat)
Pastry
Cream puff, a pastry also known as profiterole
La Religieuse, a French creme-puff like pastry